Keith Campbell (born 1938) is an Australian philosopher working in metaphysics.

Biography
With D. M. Armstrong, Campbell is one of the founders of so-called Australian materialism and, within it, of a variety of trope theory. He also has a distinctive view of concrete and abstract objects: the former can exist by themselves, and the latter are incapable of independent existence.

He refuses, following Frank P. Ramsey, the necessity of choice between realism and nominalism in the problem of universals, because they both share "a false presupposition being that any quality or relation must be a universal" (Campbell 1991, preface).

The separation between the University of Sydney's Departments of Traditional and Modern Philosophy and of General Philosophy is attributed to his organising the proposal in 1973. He was a senior lecturer in the "Traditional and Modern" one but is now an emeritus professor in the recombined Department of Philosophy (part of the School of Philosophical and Historical Inquiry).

Campbell is known as a co-editor of Ontology, Causality, and Mind: Essays in Honour of D. M. Armstrong, and as author of Body and Mind.

Bibliography 
 Body and Mind, Garden City, N.Y., Anchor Books, 1970, (2nd edition, 1984).
 Metaphysics: An introduction, Encino, Calif.: Dickenson Pub. Co., (The Dickenson series in philosophy), 1976.
 A Stoic Philosophy of Life, Lanham, MD: University Press of America, 1986.
 Abstract Particulars (Philosophical Theory), Cambridge, Mass., USA : B. Blackwell, 1991.
 Ontology, Causality, and Mind: Essays in Honour of D.M. Armstrong, Keith Campbell, John Bacon, and Lloyd Reinhardt (eds.), Cambridge: Cambridge University Press, 1993.

References 

Australian philosophers
Australian non-fiction writers
Academic staff of the University of Sydney
Living people
1938 births